Lorentz Severin Skougaard (11 May 1837 - 14 February 1885) was a Norwegian tenor.

Early life

Lorentz Severin Skougaard was born on 11 May 1837 in Farsund, Norway, the son of Jonas Eilertsen Lund Schougaard (1807-1877) and Sara Helene Jonasdatter Lund (1813-1910).

At first he was a trading officer, working at first in Memel, Norway, and then London. Later he moved to Paris and Italy to study music.

Career
In 1864 Lorentz Severin Skougaard sang in Stockholm, Berlin and Christiania. In Paris in 1866, he met Alfred Corning Clark.

In 1866 Skougaard gave a series of recitals in New York City in conjunction with Alfred H. Pease at the Irving Hall. The recitals introduced him favorably to the New York public and he became a successful vocal teacher. In 1874 he have a charitable concert at the Steinway Hall in aid of the Scandinavian poor of New York City. There were a large number of performers and it was under the patronage of many prominent persons.

Personal life

Lorentz Severin Skougaard moved to the United States in 1866. In 1869, the same year when he married, Clark began making annual summer visits to Norway with Skougaard, eventually building a house on an island near Skougaard's family home. Clark's son, born in 1870, bears the middle name of Severin.  When in New York City, Skougaard lived in Clark's flat at 64 West 22nd Street.  The apartment was a favorite evening resort for music lovers, attracted by Skougaard's very companionable qualities, and the house for years was known as "Severini Hall". According to Nicholas Fox Weber's biographer of the Clark family (The Clarks of Cooperstown, 2007), Clark led a double life, in the United States a family man, in Europe a gay aesthete. For 19 years his closest companion was Skougaard.

On 14 February 1885, in New York City, Skougaard died of typhoid fever.

Legacy

Clark eulogized him in a privately published biographical sketch, Lorentz Severin Skougaard : a sketch, mainly autobiographic and created a $64,000 endowment in his memory for Manhattan's Norwegian Hospital, 4th Avenue & 46th Street.

Clark also commissioned Brotherly Love (1886–87) to American sculptor George Grey Barnard to adorn his friend's grave in Langesund, Norway. The homoerotic sculpture depicts two nude male figures blindly reaching out to each other through the block of marble that separates them. Later Clark moved Barnard to New York City and maintained him.

References

1837 births
1885 deaths
Tenors
Norwegian LGBT singers
Norwegian gay musicians
Gay singers
People from Farsund
19th-century Norwegian male singers
Deaths from typhoid fever